"Amsterdam" is a song by American rock band Van Halen. It was primarily written by Sammy Hagar, the band's lead singer at the time for the band's 1995 studio album Balance. It was released as a single to mainstream rock and peaked at number nine on the US Billboard Hot Mainstream Rock Tracks chart during the summer of 1995.

Background 
The song was written primarily by their lead singer Sammy Hagar, but was credited to a songwriting partnership of all four members of the band — as was usual in all original Van Halen's songs — at a time when the musical differences between him and his bandamates were increasing. According to a 1995 interview on Dutch radio, the song is based upon Sammy's tourist impression of Amsterdam, such as the freedom he felt in the city.

According to Ian Christe's book Everybody Wants Some: The Van Halen Saga, Eddie and Alex Van Halen didn't like the lyrics, feeling the song did their birthplace a disservice, due to its explicit references to cannabis use (with lines such as "roll an Amsterdam", clearly it refers to "roll a joint" ) and to its little content. Sammy, however, wouldn't budge, as it was about his tourist impression over the memories of the Van Halen family homeland. About this, Eddie Van Halen said to Guitar World in 1996: 
"Well, I wasn't sober before, and I wasn't even listening to the lyrics! It's not like I suddenly wanted Sammy to be my puppet or anything, but once in a while I would take issue with a specific lyric or line. For example, I always hated the words 'wham, bam, Amsterdam,' from Balance, because they were all about smoking pot – they were just stupid. Lyrics should plant some sort of seed for thought, or at least be a little more metamorphical."

Music video
A music video was shot for "Amsterdam" in January 1995 during the band's promotional tour in Amsterdam. After the finishing touches were completed in April, Warner Bros. sent the video to MTV, who sent it back due to the song's references to marijuana, specifically the lyric "Score me some Panama Red, yeah." They altered the lyrics for the video for airplay, but MTV still refused to play it. The altered video eventually aired on MuchMusic in Canada.

References

1995 songs
Songs written by Alex Van Halen
Songs written by Eddie Van Halen
Songs written by Michael Anthony (musician)
Songs written by Sammy Hagar
Warner Records singles
1995 singles
Van Halen songs
Songs about Amsterdam
Songs about cannabis
Song recordings produced by Bruce Fairbairn